The Dessauer Marsch (Armeemarsch I, 1b) is a slow infantry march.

It is believed that the march originated from Italy. The melody of a folk song was played for Leopold I, Prince of Anhalt-Dessau after the Battle of Cassano (1705). He enjoyed the march so much, that by the time of the Battle of Turin (1706) the march was played at his entrance to the city. One of the Dessauer Marsch's most distinctive features is its elaborate trumpet solos. Up until World War I, the march was the presentation march of the Infantry Regiment Fürst Leopold von Anhalt-Dessau No. 26.

References
 Hans-Peter Stein: Transfeldt. Wort und Brauch in Heer und Flotte. 9., überarbeitete und erweiterte Auflage. Stuttgart 1986.

External links
  Text des Dessauer Marsches

German military marches
Year of song unknown